Blamey may refer to:

Blamey Barracks, Australian Army Recruit Training Centre at Kapooka, Wagga Wagga, in the Riverina region of New South Wales
Blamey Stakes, Group 2 Australian thoroughbred horse race open run at Flemington Racecourse in March each year
Marjorie Blamey OBE (born 1919), English painter and illustrator, noted for her botanical illustrations
Norman Blamey (1914–2000), English painter, noted latterly for his portraits
Thomas Blamey, GBE, KCB, CMG, DSO, ED (1884–1951), Australian General of the First and Second World Wars

See also
Blame